Clerk of the Privy Council can refer to:
Clerk of the Privy Council (Canada)
Clerk of the Privy Council (United Kingdom)

See also
Clerk
Privy council